"Désert" is Émilie Simon's debut single, released in October 2002. The song was a huge success both critically and commercially in her homeland. In the United States, a single for the English version was released in late 2006.

Music video 

The music video features Émilie Simon sitting on a bed under a lamp. She then pulls out long vines and flowers from a cut in her skin. In the end, a stranger sews back her skin with a needle and a thread. Same music videos were shot for both versions, French and English.

It was directed by Philippe André and produced by Wanda.

Track list

CD single 
"Désert" (French version)
"Desert" (English version)

CD maxi-single 
"Desert" (English version)
"Desert (Avril puzzle mix)"
"Desert (Leila remix)"
"Désert" (French version)
"Désert (Thievery Corporation remix)"

Notes 

2002 singles
2006 singles
Émilie Simon songs
2002 songs
Barclay (record label) singles